Liepona is a small rivulet that flows for  on the border of Lithuania and Kaliningrad Oblast, Russia. Left tributary to Širvinta, Liepona originates in Lithuania, near Kylininkai village.

It is famous for an incident in June 1940 when President of Lithuania Antanas Smetona had to cross the shallow river in order to reach Nazi Germany in the aftermath of the Soviet ultimatum to Lithuania. Liepona served as a natural border between Prussia and Lithuania since the Treaty of Melno of 1422 with the Teutonic Knights.

References

Rivers of Lithuania
Rivers of Kaliningrad Oblast
International rivers of Europe
Lithuania–Russia border